Edenvale Airport  is located  west of Edenvale, Ontario, Canada.

History

RCAF and World War II Airfield 1940-1946
From 1940 to 1945 it was known as RCAF Detachment Edenvale (No. 1 Relief Landing Field) as an emergency relief field supporting Camp Borden and used by the British Commonwealth Air Training Plan's No. 1 Service Flying Training School. After 1946 the RCAF buildings at Edenvale were demolished and the site abandoned.

Aerodrome information
Three runways were listed as follows:

Civilian use 1950–1959
In 1950 the airport became a civilian aerodrome, but for almost a decade it was mostly used for race car events and was referred to as Stayner or Edenvale Raceway. It was abandoned again in 1959.

Canadian Army 1962–1988

The Canadian Army took over the site in 1962 and referred to it as Edenvale Transmitter Station Bunker, a remote radio communications station to support the Cold War effort (see Emergency Government Headquarters). The military closed the station in 1988, left by 1994 and the bunker was sealed off.

Civilian use 2002–present

Since 2002, the airfield has operated as a private civilian aerodrome.

At the northeast end of the airfield is an ex-Czechoslovakian MiG-15bisSB on static display.

In November 2018 it was announced that the Canadian Air and Space Museum, which was forced out of Downsview Park in Toronto, will reopen at Edenvale Airport in 2019 and be renamed the Canadian Air & Space Conservancy.

References

External links
 Edenvale Aerodrome
 Edenvale Flyers RC Aircraft club
 Page about this airport on COPA's Places to Fly airport directory

Canadian Forces bases in Canada (closed)
Registered aerodromes in Ontario
Defunct motorsport venues in Canada
Royal Canadian Air Force stations
Military history of Ontario
Military airbases in Ontario
Nuclear bunkers in Canada
Airports of the British Commonwealth Air Training Plan